Through the Hidden Door is a young adult novel by Rosemary Wells.  This book was a runner-up for a 1988 Edgar Allan Poe Award.  The book details the story of Barney Penniman, an awkward eighth-grader with a lisp who is attending a boarding school.  Barney deals with bullies and a headmaster who dislikes him, but finds friendship with a younger, also socially awkward student named Snowy Cobb.  The two boys unearth an amazing archeological find and secretly work to dig it up.

This book was published by Puffin in 1987.

References 

1987 American novels
American young adult novels